The Basque Railway Museum is located in Azpeitia, Basque Country, Spain. It has a collection of steam locomotives and other rolling stock as well as other items, most of them related to the Basque narrow gauge railway network. The museum is located in the former railway station in Azpeitia.

The museum operates a heritage railway between Azpeitia and Lasao, on the former Urola railway line. The  line is isolated from the Euskotren network.

References

External links 
 
 
 Basque Railway Museum Foundation

Railway museums in Spain
Museums in the Basque Country (autonomous community)
Museums established in 1992
1992 establishments in Spain
Euskotren
Heritage railways in Spain